Steinhauer is a residential neighbourhood in SW Edmonton. "The neighbourhood is named for a missionary who settled in Alberta during the mid-1800s," Henry Bird Steinhauer.

The neighbourhood is bounded on the west by 111 Street, on the east by Calgary Trail, on the north by 34 Avenue.  The boundary on the south is a utility corridor located just north of 29 Avenue.

Demographics 

Residential development 
Development of the neighbourhood began after 1970.  According to the 2001 federal census, approximately nine out of every ten (87.9%) residences were constructed during the 1970s.  Most of the remainder (8.3%) were constructed during the 1980s.  Residential development was complete by 1990.

The most common type of residence in the neighbourhood, according to the 2005 municipal census, is the single-family dwelling.  These account for almost three out of every four (73%) of all the residences in the neighbourhood.  Almost all of the remaining residences (26%) are row houses.  There is a duplex in the neighbourhood.  Nine out of ten (89%) of all residences are owner-occupied with only one residence in ten (11%) being rented.

Schools and services 
There is a single school in the neighbourhood, Steinhauer Elementary School, operated by the Edmonton Public School System.

The neighbourhood is served by the Century Park LRT station located to the south in the neighbourhood of Ermineskin.

Surrounding neighbourhoods

References

External links 
 Steinhauer Neighbourhood Profile

Neighbourhoods in Edmonton